Trikomo may refer to:
Trikomo, Cyprus
Trikomo, Greece